WIZB (94.3 FM, "The Joy FM 94.3") (formerly branded as "His Radio") is a radio station licensed to serve Abbeville, Alabama, United States.  The station is owned by Radio Training Network, Inc. It broadcasts a Contemporary Christian format to the Dothan, Alabama, area.

The station also broadcasts its signal on a translator at 96.1 MHz inside the Ross Clark Circle in Dothan to improve its signal within the city.

History
WIZB started as WARI-FM on February 22, 1968, as the sister station to WARI/1480.  It changed callsigns to WXLE in 1976.  In August 1985, Henry County Radio, Inc., reached an agreement to sell WXLE to Abbeville Wireless Corporation.  The deal was approved by the Federal Communications Commission on October 2, 1985, and the transaction was consummated on January 7, 1986.

The station was assigned the WIZB call letters by the FCC on April 2, 1986.

In July 1994, Abbeville Wireless Corporation reached an agreement to sell this station to Genesis Radio Company, Inc.  The deal was approved by the FCC on November 8, 1994, and the transaction was consummated on November 25, 1994.

In March 2005, Celebration Communications Company, Inc. (Art Morris, acting chairman) reached an agreement to sell this station to Radio Training Network, Inc. (James L. Campbell, president/CEO) for a reported $288,416.  The deal was approved by the FCC on April 29, 2005, and the transaction was consummated on May 26, 2005.

Programs
 Dr David Jeremiah 4a-4:30a 
 Dr Charles Stanley 4:30a-5a 
 The Morning Cruise - weekday mornings from 5-9a
 Talkin' with Terris - weekdays from 9a-3p
 Russ & Nancy - weekdays 3-7p
 Evenings with Dan - weekdays 7-11p
 Toni - weekdays 11p-4a
 Saturdays, Earl 6-10a, Toni 10-2p, Earl 2-6p, Donna Cruz 6p-12a
 Sundays, Warm Up To Worship 5-9a, Churches 9a-12p, Nancy 12-3p, Misty 3-6p Donna Cruz 6p-11p

References

External links

Contemporary Christian radio stations in the United States
Henry County, Alabama
Radio stations established in 1986
1986 establishments in Alabama
IZB